"I Need to Be in Love" is a song written by Richard Carpenter, Albert Hammond and John Bettis. It was released as a single on May 21, 1976. It was featured on the A Kind of Hush album, which was released on June 11 of the same year.

Background
The single featured a version without the piano lead-in and starts immediately with a flute introduction by David Shostac. Richard recalled that it was Karen's favorite Carpenters song.

Reception
Cash Box said that it starts with a "beautiful string introduction" and that "Karen Carpenter’s voice slips in with a sweet ballad melody."

Personnel
Karen Carpenter - lead vocals
Richard Carpenter - piano, Fender Rhodes electric piano, harpsichord, Hammond organ, orchestration
Joe Osborn - bass
Tony Peluso - electric guitar
Jim Gordon - drums
Earle Dumler - English horn
Gayle Levant - harp
David Shostac - flute
The O.K. Chorale - backing vocals

Chart performance
The song entered the Billboard Hot 100 on June 12 at number 55, and peaked at number 25. It peaked at number 36 on the UK charts. In 1995, it was released as a CD single in Japan, after being chosen for the theme song of the drama Miseinen. It was taken from the best-selling compilation 22 Hits of the Carpenters (promoted as a double A-side with "Top of the World"). Richard Carpenter claims that "It became one of the biggest sellers of 1995, ultimately going quadruple platinum. In more ways than one, Karen would have loved that!" "I Need to Be in Love" was also the Carpenters' fourteenth number one on the Easy Listening chart.

Certifications

Cover versions
 Shirley Bassey recorded this song on her 1977 album You Take My Heart Away.
Filipino bossa nova singer Sitti recorded a cover of this song for her second album My Bossa Nova.
This song was sung by the Pakistani pop singer Hadiqa Kiyani as a tribute to the Carpenters.
Japanese female singer Chihiro Onitsuka covered the song for her 2012 cover album Famous Microphone.
Korean jazz duo Winterplay covered the song for their 2010 album Touché Mon Amour.
 In 2016, Dami Im recorded a version for her album Classic Carpenters.
 Richard Carpenter recorded a solo piano/vocal version live on Japanese television.
Michael Poss recorded this song combined with "They Say It's Wonderful" by Irving Berlin on his 2000 album Silver Screen Serenades

See also
List of number-one adult contemporary singles of 1976 (U.S.)

References

The Carpenters songs
1976 singles
1995 singles
Oricon International Singles Chart number-one singles
Songs written by Albert Hammond
Songs with lyrics by John Bettis
Songs written by Richard Carpenter (musician)
Japanese television drama theme songs
1976 songs
A&M Records singles
Dami Im songs